The 2011 Chinese Professional Baseball League (CPBL) season began on March 19 in Kaohsiung County when the defending champion Lamigo Monkeys played host to the Uni-President 7-Eleven Lions.  The season concluded in late October with the Uni-President 7-Eleven Lions defeating the Lamigo Monkeys in Game 7 of the Taiwan Series.

Competition

Four teams, the Lamigo Monkeys, Uni-President 7-Eleven Lions, Sinon Bulls and Brother Elephants will contest the CPBL, the highest level of professional baseball played in Taiwan.  The season is divided into two halves, with each team playing sixty games in each half.  The winners for each half-season plus the non-winner with the best overall record will qualify for the playoffs.  In the event that the same team wins both halves, the next two teams with the best overall records will advance.

Standings

First Half standings

Second Half Standings

Overall standings

Green denotes first half or second half champion.

Statistical leaders

Hitting

Pitching

Month MVP

Final

Participants
Uni-President 7-Eleven Lions - Winner of the first half-season.
Lamigo Monkeys - Winner of the second half-season.
The Lions and the Monkeys played each other in 40 regular season games, and the Monkeys had the upper hand with 21 wins, 18 losses, and one tied game. The two teams also played each other in the 2006 Taiwan Series and 2007 Taiwan Series; the Monkeys defeated the Lions in 2006, but the Lions claimed the title in 2007.

Rules
All regular season rules apply with the following exceptions:
 Each team is allowed to register 28 players on its active roster.
 No tied games.
 Two outfield umpires are added to the games.

External links

Chinese Professional Baseball League season
CPBL season
Chinese Professional Baseball League seasons